Brunonian or Brunonians usually refer to alumni of Brown University and Pembroke College in Brown University. The terms may also refer to:

 The Brunonian, a predecessor and rival newspaper of The Brown Daily Herald
 Brunonian system of medicine
 Brunonids, a Saxon noble family in the 10th and 11th centuries